The 1946–47 BAA season was the first and only season for the Detroit Falcons in the Basketball Association of America (BAA/NBA). After finishing with a 20–40 record, the Falcons were disbanded.

Roster

Regular season

Season standings

Record vs. opponents

Game log

References

Detroit
Detroit Falcons (basketball) seasons